is a railway station located in the town of Tōhoku in Aomori Prefecture, Japan. The station has been operating since 1910. Since 2010, the station has been operated by the Aoimori Railway Company, a third sector, regional rail operator. It is the least busy railway station along the Aoimori Railway. Passenger trains serve the station 17 hours a day; trains depart from the station roughly once an hour.

Location
Chibiki Station is located beneath an underpass of Aomori Prefecture Route 8. The station is located in a very rural setting with no houses or buildings within walking distance. It is 70.9 kilometers from the terminus of the line at Aomori Station. The stations adjacent to Chibiki Station along the Aoimori Railway Line are Ottomo Station and Noheji Station.

Station layout
Chibiki Station has two opposed side platforms connected by a road overpass that serve two tracks. There is no station building and the platforms are not numbered. The station is unattended.

Platforms

History
Chibiki Station was opened on 15 November 1910 as a station on the Tōhoku Main Line of the Japanese Government Railways (JGR), the pre-war predecessor to the Japan National Railways (JNR). On 20 October 1962, it became a joint station with the now defunct Nanbu Jūkan Railway. On 5 August 1968, the routing of the Tōhoku Main Line slightly changed, and a new station was built, with the original Chibiki Station renamed  serving only the Nanbu Jūkan Railway. Regularly scheduled freight services were also discontinued with the move. With the privatization of the JNR on 1 April 1987, the station came under the operational control of East Japan Railway Company (JR East).

The section of the Tōhoku Main Line including this station was transferred to Aoimori Railway on 4 December 2010.

Services

The station is only served by trains operating on a local service between Aomori and Hachinohe. Passenger trains serve Chibiki Station just under 17 hours a day from 6:23am to 11:11pm. Trains depart from the station at an approximate hourly basis. In 2018, a daily average of 2 passengers boarded trains at Chibiki Station. In that year Chibiki Station was the least busy out of all the stations on the entire Aoimori Railway Line.

See also
 List of railway stations in Japan

References

External links

 

Railway stations in Aomori Prefecture
Railway stations in Japan opened in 1910
Tōhoku, Aomori
Aoimori Railway Line